The Kırklareli University was founded at 2007 under the administration of the Trakya University  Rectorate Enver Duran. The university is based on a strong background of the Faculty of Engineering, built at 1992.

The university has four faculties, two institutes, seven vocational schools and a school of health, with nearly 10,000 students, more than 300 academic and 200 administrative staff.

The university is a member of the Balkan Universities Network.

In 2008 the university held a competition on who could design a new logo. The winning logo was one resembling the Emblem of Macau. The university did not pay the award money as it received concerns that the logo may be plagiarised.

See also
List of universities in Turkey
List of colleges and universities
List of colleges and universities by country

External links
 Webpage Kirklareli University

References

State universities and colleges in Turkey
Universities and colleges in Turkey
Educational institutions established in 2007
2007 establishments in Turkey
University